Salt Rural LLG is a local-level government (LLG) of Chimbu Province, Papua New Guinea. The Salt language is spoken in the LLG.

Wards
01. Banievera
02. Sua Begen
03. Dirima 2
04. Dayani
05. Goroba
06. Ainabane
07. Perwi
08. Yopakeni
09. Yopaeri
10. Mogiagi
11. Morinil/Kori
12. Yopakul
13. Waido
14. Tapiekul
15. Kobiebalmil
16. Tapai
17. Yuribol
18. Mirima
19. Bori
20. Mulugra
21. Mankon
22. Kama
23. Gaima

References

Local-level governments of Chimbu Province